Edwin H. Williams  (born 1868) was a Welsh international footballer. He was part of the Wales national football team, playing 2 matches. He played his first match on 13 March 1893 against England and his last match on 18 March 1893 against Scotland. At club level, he played for Saltney Victoria (1887/88), Over Wanderers (1888/89), Chester (1889/90) and Crewe Alexandra (1889-1893).  He also turned out for Nantwich (1892/93), later becoming the local reporter for 'The Nantwich Chronicle' for over half a century.

See also
 List of Wales international footballers (alphabetical)

References

1868 births
People from Hawarden
Sportspeople from Flintshire
Welsh footballers
Wales international footballers
Crewe Alexandra F.C. players
1950 deaths
Association footballers not categorized by position